Tony Blevins (born January 29, 1975) is a former professional American football cornerback in the National Football League. He played three seasons for the San Francisco 49ers (1998) and the Indianapolis Colts (1998–2000).

1975 births
Living people
Sportspeople from Rockford, Illinois
Players of American football from Illinois
American football cornerbacks
Kansas Jayhawks football players
San Francisco 49ers players
Indianapolis Colts players